Two ships of the United States Navy have been named Solace:
 was a hospital ship in service during the Spanish–American War and World War I
 was a hospital ship in service during World War II

United States Navy ship names